The Canadian Screen Award for Best Pre-School Program or Series is an annual television award, presented by the Academy of Canadian Cinema and Television to honour the year's best television programming for preschool children produced in Canada.

The award was first presented in 1998 as part of the Gemini Awards program. Prior to 1998, programming for preschool children was eligible for the Gemini Award for Best Children's or Youth Program or Series.

Since 2013, the award has been presented as part of the Canadian Screen Awards.

Winners and nominees
Due to the distinction between the former Gemini Awards, which were usually presented in the late fall of the same year that the awards were presented for, and the current Canadian Screen Awards, which are presented early in the following year, awards are listed below under the year of eligibility rather than the year of presentation for consistency.

1990s

2000s

2010s

2020s

References 

Pre-School